The 1953 Chinese census, officially the First National Population Census of the People's Republic of China, was conducted by the People's Republic of China starting on June 30, 1953. The results were summarized in Chinese newspapers on November 1, 1954. As the full results were not published, they had to subsequently be assembled from Soviet sources over the next five years.

Results

Total population
The official summaries listed the total population of Mainland China in 1953 as 582,603,417.

Demographics
13.26% of the population (77,257,282 persons) were listed as residing in urban areas comprising 163 cities, industrial and mining districts, and about 1450 towns. Of the urban population, roughly 1 in 12 resided in Shanghai.

Distribution

Controversy
China had never previously had an official national census in the modern period and estimates of its population even in 1911 varied between 200,000,000 and 400,000,000. Mistrust of PRC statistics that saw the number of cities go from 60 under the Nationalist government to 103 within four years and that involved "indirectly survey[ing]" several areas including Tibet led some Western academics like George Cressey to claim, "These inflated figures are designed to impress the world with China's strength, to support claims for a falling death rate, or to supply an excuse for food shortages."

See also
 Demographics of China
 Urbanization in China
 Census in China

Notes

References

1953
1953 in China
China